The Hurrians (transliteration: Ḫu-ur-ri; also called Hari, Khurrites, Hourri, Churri, Hurri or Hurriter) were a people of the Bronze Age Near East. They spoke a Hurrian language and lived in Anatolia, Syria and Northern Mesopotamia. The largest and most influential Hurrian nation was the kingdom of Mitanni. The population of the Hittite Empire in Anatolia included a large population of Hurrians, and there is significant Hurrian influence in Hittite mythology. By the Early Iron Age, the Hurrians had been assimilated with other peoples. The state of Urartu later covered some of the same area.

History

Early Bronze Age

The Khabur River valley became the heart of the Hurrian lands for a millennium. The first known Hurrian kingdom emerged around the city of Urkesh (modern Tell Mozan) during the third millennium BC. There is evidence that they were initially allied with the Akkadian Empire of Mesopotamia, indicating they had a firm hold on the area by the reign of Naram-Sin of Akkad (c. 2254–2218 BC). A king of Urkesh with the Hurrian name Tupkish had a queen with the name Uqnitum, Akkadian for "girl of lapis lazuli".

Middle Bronze Age
Hurrian names occur sporadically in northwestern Mesopotamia and the area of Kirkuk in modern Iraq by the Middle Bronze Age. Their presence was attested at Nuzi, Urkesh and other sites. They eventually occupied a broad arc of fertile farmland stretching from the Khabur River valley in the west to the foothills of the Zagros Mountains in the east. By this point, during the Old Babylonian period in the early second millennium BC, the Amorite kingdom of Mari to the south had subdued Urkesh and made it a vassal state. Urkesh later became a Mitanni religious center.

The Hurrians also migrated further west in this period. By 1725 BC they are found also in parts of northern Syria, such as Alalakh. The mixed Amorite–Hurrian kingdom of Yamhad is recorded as struggling for this area with the early Hittite king Hattusilis I around 1600 BC. Hurrians also settled in the coastal region of Adaniya in the country of Kizzuwatna, southern Anatolia. Yamhad eventually weakened vis-a-vis the powerful Hittites, but this also opened Anatolia for Hurrian cultural influences. The Hittites were influenced by both the Hurrian cultures over the course of several centuries.

Late Bronze Age

The Mitanni Empire was a strong regional power limited by the Hittites to the north, Egyptians to the east, Kassites to the south, and later by the Assyrians to the west. At its maximum extent Mitanni ranged as far as west as Kizzuwatna by the Taurus mountains, Tunip in the south, Arraphe in the east, and north to Lake Van. Their sphere of influence is shown in spread Hurrian place names, personal names. Eventually, after an internal succession crisis, Mitanni fell to the Hittites, later to fall under the control of the Assyrians.

The Hurrian entity of Mitanni, which first rose to power before 1550 BC, was first mentioned in the records of Egyptian pharaohs Thutmose I (1506–1493 BC) and Thutmose III (1479 – 1425 BC), the later most notably associated with the Battle of Megiddo in that pharoahs 22 regnal year. Most of the time Egyptians referred to the kingdom as Naharin. Later, Mitanni and Hanigailbat are mention in the Amarna Letters during the time of Pharaoh Akhenaten (1353–1336 BC). Domestically, Mitanni records have been found at a number of places in the region including several Hittite sites as well as Tell Bazi, Alalakh, Nuzi, Mardaman, Kemune, and Müslümantepe among others.

Another major center of Hurrian influence was the kingdom of Arrapha. Excavations at Yorgan Tepe, ancient Nuzi, proved this to be one of the most important sites for our knowledge about the Hurrians. Hurrian kings such as Ithi-Teshup and Ithiya ruled over Arrapha, yet by the mid-fifteenth century BC they had become vassals of the Great King of Mitanni.

Urartu
At the end of the 2nd Millennium BC the Urartians around Lake Van and Mount Ararat rose in power forming the Kingdom of Urartu. During the 11th and 10th centuries BC, the kingdom eventually encompassed a region stretching from the Caucasus Mountains in the north, to the borders of northern Assyria and northern Ancient Iran in the south, and controlled much of eastern Anatolia. Some scientists consider Urartu to be a re-consolidation of earlier Hurrian populations mainly due to linguistic factors but this view is not universally held.

Culture and society

Knowledge of Hurrian culture relies on archaeological excavations at sites such as Nuzi and Alalakh as well as on cuneiform tablets, primarily from Hattusa (Boghazköy), the capital of the Hittites, whose civilization was greatly influenced by the Hurrians. Tablets from Nuzi, Alalakh, and other cities with Hurrian populations (as shown by personal names) reveal Hurrian cultural features even though they were written in Akkadian. Hurrian cylinder seals were carefully carved and often portrayed mythological motifs. They are a key to the understanding of Hurrian culture and history.

The 2nd millennium Hurrians were masterful ceramists. Their pottery is commonly found in Mesopotamia and in the lands west of the Euphrates; it was highly valued in distant Egypt, by the time of the New Kingdom. Archaeologists use the terms Khabur ware and Nuzi ware for two types of wheel-made pottery used by the Hurrians. Khabur ware is characterized by reddish painted lines with a geometric triangular pattern and dots, while Nuzi ware has very distinctive forms, and are painted in brown or black. They were also skilled at glass working.

The Hurrians had a reputation in metallurgy. It is proposed that the Sumerian term for "coppersmith" tabira/tibira was borrowed from Hurrian, which would imply an early presence of the Hurrians way before their first historical mention in Akkadian sources. Copper was traded south to Mesopotamia from the highlands of Anatolia. The Khabur Valley had a central position in the metal trade, and copper, silver and even tin were accessible from the Hurrian-dominated countries Kizzuwatna and Ishuwa situated in the Anatolian highland. Gold was in short supply, and the Amarna letters inform us that it was acquired from Egypt. Not many examples of Hurrian metal work have survived, except from the later Urartu. Some small fine bronze lion foundation pegs were discovered at Urkesh.

Among the Hurrian texts from Ugarit are the oldest known instances of written music, dating from c. 1400 BC. Among these fragments are found the names of four Hurrian composers, Tapšiẖuni, Puẖiya(na), Urẖiya, and Ammiya.

Religion

The Hurrian culture made a great impact on the religion of the Hittites. From the Hurrian cult centre at Kummanni in Kizzuwatna, Hurrian religion spread to the Hittite people. Syncretism merged the Old Hittite and Hurrian religions. Hurrian religion spread to Syria, where Baal became the counterpart of Teshub. The Hurrian religion, in different forms, influenced the entire ancient Near East, except ancient Egypt and southern Mesopotamia.

While the Hurrian and Urartian languages are related, there is little similarity between corresponding systems of belief.

The main gods in the Hurrian pantheon were:
 Teshub, Teshup, the mighty weather god.
 Hebat, Hepa, his wife, the mother goddess, later equated with the main sun goddess of the Hittites
 Sharruma, or Sarruma, Šarruma, their son, a mountain god of Syrian origin.
 Kumarbi, grain god,  the father of Teshub and a "father of gods" similar to Enlil; his home as described in mythology is the city of Urkesh.
 Shaushka, or Shawushka, Šauska, the Hurrian counterpart of Ishtar, and a goddess of love, war and healing.
 Shimegi, Šimegi, the sun god.
 Kushuh, Kušuh, the moon god and a guardian of oaths. Symbols of the sun and the crescent moon appear joined together in the Hurrian iconography.
 Nergal, a Sumerian deity of the netherworld, who had a prominent temple in Urkesh in the earliest period of recorded Hurrian history. Possibly a stand-in for a god whose Hurrian name is presently unknown.
 Ea, Hayya, the god of wisdom, who was also Mesopotamian in origin.
 Allani, goddess of the netherworld.
 Ishara, a goddess of Syrian origin.
 Aštabi, a war god. 
 Nupatik, a prominent god of uncertain function.
 Hutena and Hutellura, fate and birth goddesses.

Hurrian cylinder seals often depict mythological creatures such as winged humans or animals, dragons and other monsters. The interpretation of these depictions of gods and demons remains  uncertain. They may have been both protective and evil spirits. Some are reminiscent of the Assyrian shedu.

The Hurrian gods do not appear to have had particular "home temples", like in the Mesopotamian religion or Ancient Egyptian religion. Some important cult centres were Kummanni in Kizzuwatna and Hittite Yazilikaya. Harran was at least later a religious centre for the moon god, and Shauskha had an important temple in Nineve, when the city was under Hurrian rule. A temple of Nergal was built in Urkesh in the late third millennium BC. The town of Kahat was a religious centre in the kingdom of Mitanni.

The Hurrian myth "The Songs of Ullikummi", preserved among the Hittites, is a parallel to Hesiod's Theogony; the castration of Uranus by Cronus may be derived from the castration of Anu by Kumarbi, while Zeus's overthrow of Cronus and Cronus's regurgitation of the swallowed gods is like the Hurrian myth of Teshub and Kumarbi. It has been argued that the worship of Attis drew on Hurrian myth.

Language

The agglutinating and highly ergative Hurrian language is related to the Urartian language, the language of the ancient kingdom of Urartu. Together they form the Hurro-Urartian language family. The external connections of the Hurro-Urartian languages are disputed. There exist various proposals for a genetic relationship to other language families (e.g. the Northeast Caucasian languages), but none of these are generally accepted.

The Hurrians adopted the Akkadian language and Cuneiform script for their own writing about 2000 BC. Texts in the Hurrian language in cuneiform have been found at Hattusa, Ugarit (Ras Shamra), as well as in one of the longest of the Amarna letters (EA 27), written by King Tushratta of Mitanni to Pharaoh Amenhotep III. It was the only long Hurrian text known until a multi-tablet collection of literature in Hurrian with a Hittite translation was discovered at Hattusa in 1983.

Archaeology
Hurrian settlements are distributed over three modern countries, Iraq, Syria and Turkey. The heart of the Hurrian world is bisected by the modern border between Syria and Turkey. Several sites are situated within the border zone, making access for excavations problematic. A threat to the ancient sites are the many dam projects in the Euphrates, Tigris and Khabur valleys. Several rescue operations have already been undertaken when the construction of dams put entire river valleys under water.

The first major excavations of Hurrian sites in Iraq and Syria began in the 1920s and 1930s. They were led by the American archaeologist Edward Chiera at Yorghan Tepe (Nuzi), and the British archaeologist Max Mallowan at Chagar Bazar and Tell Brak. Recent excavations and surveys in progress are conducted by American, Belgian, Danish, Dutch, French, German and Italian teams of archaeologists, with international participants, in cooperation with the Syrian Department of Antiquities. The tells, or city mounds, often reveal a long occupation beginning in the Neolithic and ending in the Roman period or later. The characteristic Hurrian pottery, the Khabur ware, is helpful in determining the different strata of occupation within the mounds. The Hurrian settlements are usually identified from the Middle Bronze Age to the end of the Late Bronze Age, with Tell Mozan (Urkesh) being the main exception.

Important sites
The list includes some important ancient sites from the area dominated by the Hurrians. Excavation reports and images are found at the websites linked. As noted above, important discoveries of Hurrian culture and history were also made at Alalakh, Amarna, Hattusa and Ugarit.

See also
 Horites
 Urartu
 Mitanni
 Nairi
 Kassites
 Hurrian songs

References

Further reading
Buccellati, Giorgio, and Marilyn Kelly-Buccellati. “Urkesh: The First Hurrian Capital.” The Biblical Archaeologist, vol. 60, no. 2, 1997, pp. 77–96
Campbell, Dennis R. M., and Sebastian Fischer, "A HURRIAN RITUAL AGAINST TOOTHACHE: A REANALYSIS OF MARI 5", Revue d’Assyriologie et d’archéologie Orientale, vol. 112, pp. 31–48, 2018
 Fournet, Arnaud, "About Eni, the Hurrian Word for ‘God.’", Journal of Near Eastern Studies, vol. 71, no. 1, pp. 91–94, 2012
 Greene, Joseph A., "‘Nuzi and the Hurrians: Fragments from a Forgotten Past’: A Slice of Mesopotamian Life in the Fourteenth Century BCE", Near Eastern Archaeology, vol. 61, no. 1, pp. 66–66, 1998
 Güterbock, Hans Gustav, "The Hittite Version of the Hurrian Kumarbi Myths: Oriental Forerunners of Hesiod", American Journal of Archaeology, vol. 52, no. 1, pp. 123–34, 1948
 Hawkes, Jacquetta, The First Great Civilizations: Life in Mesopotamia, the Indus Valley, and Egypt, Knopf, 1973  
 Kilmer, Anne Draffkorn. "The Discovery of an Ancient Mesopotamian Theory of Music". Proceedings of the American Philosophical Association 115, no. 2 (April 1971): 131–49.
 Kilmer, Anne Draffkorn, Richard L. Crocker, and Robert R. Brown. Sounds from Silence: Recent Discoveries in Ancient Near Eastern Music. Berkeley: Bit Enki Publications, 1976. (booklet and LP record, Bit Enki Records BTNK 101, reissued [s.d.] with CD).
 Speiser, E. A., Introduction to Hurrian, New Haven, ASOR 1941.
 Vitale, Raoul. "La Musique suméro-accadienne: gamme et notation musicale". Ugarit-Forschungen 14 (1982): 241–63.
 Wilhelm, Gernot (ed.). Nuzi at Seventy-five. Studies in the Civilization and Culture of Nuzi and the Hurrians. Bethesda: Capital Decisions, Ltd., 1999
 Wilhelm, G, "A Hurrian Letter from Tell Brak", Iraq, vol. 53, pp. 159–68, 1991
 Wegner, Ilse. Einführung in die hurritische Sprache, 2. überarbeitete Aufl. Wiesbaden: Harrassowitz, 2007. 
 Wulstan, David. "The Tuning of the Babylonian Harp", Iraq 30 (1968): 215–28.

External links

Morning Concert: An Hurrian Cult Song from Ancient Ugarit - music and audio interview with Anne Draffkorn Kilmer - 1978
  Vyacheslav V. Ivanov, "Comparative Notes on Hurro-Urartian, Indo-European, and Northern Caucasian"—Discusses the difficulties and disagreements faced by linguists working in this area, the term Alarodian being created especially for the Hurro-Urartian-Nakh-Avar languages as a family.
 The Indo-European Elements in Hurrian
 A bibliography on Hurrian
 A bibliography on Urartian
 "The Hurrians and the Ancient Near East History" by Jeremiah Genest

 
States and territories established in the 3rd millennium BC
States and territories disestablished in the 6th century BC
Ancient Syria